Prince Yuryevsky ( - masculine) or princess Yuryevskaya ( - feminine) may refer to:
Catherine Dolgorukova (1847–1922), styled Princess Yuryevskaya after her morganatic marriage with Tsar Alexander II of Russia, and their three surviving children:
 Prince George Alexandrovich Yuryevsky (12 May 1872 – 13 September 1913), who married Countess Alexandra von Zarnekau, herself the child of a morganatic marriage, and had issue. They later divorced.
 Princess Olga Alexandrovna Yurievskaya (7 November 1873 – 10 August 1925), who married Georg Nikolaus, Count of Merenberg, likewise the child of a morganatic marriage.
 Princess Catherine Alexandrovna Yurievskaya (9 September 1878 – 22 December 1959), whose first husband was Prince Alexander Vladimirovich Baryatinsky (1870–1910). Her second husband, later divorced, was Prince Serge Obolensky (1890–1978).

Family tree

See also
Svyatoslav Yuryevich, Prince Yuryevsky (Prince of Yuryev), son  of Yury Dolgoruky (1099–1157)
Yuryev (disambiguation)
Branches of the Russian Imperial Family